Sydney, Australia is home to a large number of cultural institutions, museums and historic sites, some of which are known worldwide. This list contains the most famous:

See also
Culture of Sydney
List of attractions in Sydney
List of museums in New South Wales

References 

Sydney

Museums
Sydney
Museums